The 2010 Plymouth City Council election was held on 6 May 2010 to elect members of Plymouth City Council in England.

The Conservative Party remained in control of the council with a reduced majority.

Background 
Plymouth City Council held local elections on 6 May 2010 along with councils across the United Kingdom as part of the 2010 local elections. The council elects its councillors in thirds, with nineteen being up for election every year for three years, with no election in the fourth year.

Councillors defending their seats were previously elected in 2006. In that election, twelve Conservative candidates and seven Labour candidates were elected. This election followed a by-election in Ham, which resulted in a Labour hold.

The Conservative Party had control of the council ahead of this election, with 37 councillors and a majority of eight seats.

The Conservatives were defending 12 seats, the Labour Party 6 and the former Labour candidate, Andy Kerswell, was defending his seat in Efford and Lipson as an independent.

If the Labour Party was to regain the majority they held on the council until 2006, they needed to gain 11 seats, which they failed to do, although made two gains (one against a Conservative and the other against Andy Kerswell) despite a national swing against them.

Overall results

|-
| colspan=2 style="text-align: right; margin-right: 1em" | Total
| style="text-align: right;" | 20
| colspan=5 |
| style="text-align: right;" | 110,091
| style="text-align: right;" | 

Note: All changes in vote share are in comparison to the corresponding 2006 election.

Seats up for election in 2010
Gains are shown by highlighting in the winning party's colours, comparing them to when these councillors were last up for election in 2006.

Ward results

Budshead

Compton

Devonport

Drake

Efford and Lipson

Eggbuckland

Ham

Honicknowle

Moor View

Peverell

Plympton Chaddlewood

Plympton St Mary

Plymstock Dunstone

Plymstock Radford

St Budeax

St Peter and the Waterfront

Southway

Stoke

Sutton and Mount Gould

See also
 List of wards in Plymouth

References

2010 English local elections
May 2010 events in the United Kingdom
2010
2010s in Devon